Armed Forces Radio is a Nigerian military radio station owned by the Nigerian Armed Forces. The station is located at Mogadishu Cantonment in Abuja and broadcasts on 107.7 FM.

History
The station was officially inaugurated by President Goodluck Jonathan on 22 May 2015.

References 

Radio stations in Nigeria
2015 establishments in Nigeria
Radio stations established in 2015
Military of Nigeria
Military broadcasting